Power up may refer to:

 Power-up, a video gaming term
 FIRST Power Up, the 2018 FIRST Robotics Competition game
 POWER UP, an American nonprofit organization
 "Power Up" (song), a 2018 song by Red Velvet from their EP Summer Magic
 Power Up (album), 2020 studio album by AC/DC